George W. Ford (1844 – November 29, 1883) was an Irish soldier who fought in the American Civil War. Ford received the United States' highest award for bravery during combat, the Medal of Honor, for his action during the Battle of Sayler's Creek in Virginia on 6 April 1865. He was honored with the award on 10 May 1865.

Biography
Ford was born in Ireland in 1844. He joined the 88th New York Infantry as a sergeant in September 1861. He was commissioned as a first lieutenant in July 1864, and mustered out with his regiment in June 1865.    He was a companion of the New York Commandery of the Military Order of the Loyal Legion of the United States.

Ford died on 29 November 1883 and his remains are interred at the Calvary Cemetery in Woodside, New York.

Medal of Honor citation

See also

List of American Civil War Medal of Honor recipients: A–F

References

1844 births
1883 deaths
Irish-born Medal of Honor recipients
People of New York (state) in the American Civil War
Union Army officers
United States Army Medal of Honor recipients
American Civil War recipients of the Medal of Honor